Myrmecia vindex is a species of Myrmecia which is native in Australia. As a subgroup of the Myrmecia gulosa species group, these ants are also commonly known as the Bull Ant. The Myrmecia vindex was collected and described by Frederick Smith in 1858.

Appearance
Myrmecia vindexs are around 21 millimetres long on average, and they have normally have a red head, and a black abdomen. Their mandibles are long, strongly toothed, and appears in a yellow palish colour.

Habitat 
These ants are commonly found in western Australia, but also ranges further into South Australia. They prefers to live in open, dry woodland habitat.

Behavior 
The nocturnal M. vindex relies exclusively on vision for navigation with eyes having ultraviolet-, blue- and a green-sensitive photoreceptor cells. Compared to other species within the genus Myrmecia, M. vindex are socially less evolved and typically have small populations. During the height of their breeding season, Myrmecia vindex commonly pile discarded cocoons and shed exoskeletons on the crater of their nest, near the entrance.

References 

Myrmeciinae
Hymenoptera of Australia
Insects of Australia
Insects described in 1858